Stronger is an album released in 2008 by American country music singer Carlene Carter. Included is "I'm So Cool," a song originally recorded on Carter's 1980 album, Musical Shapes.

Track listing
All tracks composed by Carlene Carter; except where indicated

"The Bitter End" (Carter, Mark Winchester) – 3:20
"Why Be Blue" – 2:55
"To Change Your Heart" – 4:17
"Bring Love" – 3:43
"I'm So Cool" – 3:21
"Spider Lace" – 3:37
"On To You" – 3:07
"Judgement Day" – 4:27
"Break My Little Heart in Two" – 2:46
"It Takes One to Know Me" – 3:15
"Light of Your Love" – 2:56
"Stronger" – 5:03

A 13th track, "When the Long Road Ends", was made available for download by Yep Roc Records until March 4, 2009 for purchasers of a limited edition CD pressing.

Chart performance

References

2008 albums
Carlene Carter albums
Yep Roc Records albums